Ylber Hysa was a member of the Assembly of Kosovo. He is a member of the Reformist Party ORA and a civil rights activist, and for many years was the director of Kosovo Action for Civic Initiatives (KACI), a Kosovo Albanian non-governmental organization.

In September 2007 he was ORA's nominee for the mayoralty of Pristina.

References

Year of birth missing (living people)
Living people
Kosovo Albanians
Reformist Party ORA politicians
Politicians from Pristina
1965 births